Alan Kaufman is an American writer, memoirist and poet.  He is the author of the memoirs Jew Boy and Drunken Angel, the novel [Matches], and is listed as editor of The Outlaw Bible of American Poetry.
He is also listed as co-editor of The Outlaw Bible of American Literature, alongside Barney Rosset and Neil Ortenberg.

Background
Kaufman is the editor of many anthologies, including The Outlaw Bible of American Literature, which was reviewed on the cover of The New York Times Book Review and The New Generation:Fiction For Our Time From America's Writing Programs. The final volume of the Outlaw anthologies trilogy, The Outlaw Bible of American Essays,  appeared on bookshelves during the Fall of 2006. He is also the author of a volume of poetry, 'Who Are We?'.

Kaufman has taught in the graduate and undergraduate schools of the Academy of Art University and in writing workshops in San Francisco. His work has appeared in Salon, Los Angeles Times, Partisan Review, Tel Aviv Review, San Francisco Examiner, and the San Francisco Chronicle.

Kaufman himself has been widely anthologized, most recently in "Nothing Makes You Free: Writings From Descendants of Holocaust Survivors (TimeBeing Books)" (WW Norton) and Blood To Remember:American Poets On The Holocaust.

Kaufman is a member of PEN American Center and is listed in the Europa Biographical Reference Series.

Published works
Alan Kaufman's Matches was published by Little, Brown and Company in the Fall of 2005, and was published in the United Kingdom by Constable and Robinson the following year.

His memoir – Jew Boy'' – was published by Fromm International Farrar, Straus, and Giroux and Foxrock Books, imprint of Grove Press publisher and founder Barney Rosset.

His memoir "Drunken Angel" was published in paperback and hardcover by Viva Editions/Cleis Press in 2011 and 2013.

His anthology "The Outlaw Bible of American Poetry" was published in 1999 by Thunders Mouth Press and is now published by Perseus Books.

His anthology (with Barney Rosset) "The Outlaw Bible of American Literature" was published in 2004 by Thunders Mouth Press and is now published by Perseus Books.

His anthology "The Outlaw Bible of American Essays" was published in 2006 by Thunder's Mouth Press and is now published by Perseus Books.

His anthology "The New Generation: Fiction For Our Time From America's Writing Programs" was published in 1987 by Anchor/Doubleday.

References

THE ALAN KAUFMAN PAPERS, Special Collections, University of Delaware Library, Newark, Delaware
PEN AMERICAN CENTER/About Alan Kaufman
THE POETRY FOUNDATION/About Alan Kaufman
HUFFINGTON POST INTERVIEW WITH ALAN KAUFMAN
SAN FRANCISCO CHRONICLE FRONT PAGE Book Review of Alan Kaufman's Memoir JEW BOY
SAN FRANCISCO CHRONICLE FRONT PAGE Book Review of Alan Kaufman's novel MATCHES
NEW YORK TIMES BOOK REVIEW OF ALAN KAUFMAN'S THE OUTLAW BIBLE OF AMERICAN LITERATURE
PUBLISHERS WEEKLY review of Alan Kaufman's memoir DRUNKEN ANGEL
PUBLISHERS WEEKLY review of Alan Kaufman's memour JEW BOY
PUBLISHERS WEEKLY review of Alan Kaufman's novel MATCHES

Outlaw poets
Living people
American male poets
Academy of Art University faculty
Year of birth missing (living people)